Cornel Popa may refer to:

  (1932–2008), Romanian film and television director
 Cornel Popa (footballer) (1935–1999), Romanian footballer
  (b. 1951), Romanian politician